Ungku Zeti Akhtar binti Ungku Abdul Aziz (born 26 August 1947) was the 7th Governor of Bank Negara Malaysia, Malaysia's central bank. She served as Governor from 2000 to 2016, and was the first woman in the position. Zeti was one of the members of the Council of Eminent Persons (CEP) in Mahathir's second administration, a special advisory council advising the government on economic and financial matters during this transitional period.

Early life
Zeti Akhtar Aziz was born in Johor Bahru, Johor on 26 August 1947; to father Ungku Aziz, who is of Malay, Circassian and English descent, and mother Sharifah Azah Mohamed Alsagoff, who was of Hadhrami Arab and Malay descent. Her father Ungku Aziz was an economist and former vice-chancellor for the University of Malaya from 1968 to 1988. He received the title "Royal Professor".

She received her early education at the Assunta School, Petaling Jaya in 1964. She then completed her Form 6 in St. John's Institution, Kuala Lumpur. In 1970, she received a bachelor's degree in Economics from University Malaya.

She continued her studies in the Department of Economics at the University of Pennsylvania (Penn), an Ivy League university in Philadelphia, receiving a PhD in monetary and international economics in 1978. As part of her PhD dissertation, she carried out pioneering work on capital flows and its implications for monetary policy.

Career
Zeti began her career as an economic analyst for the South-East Asia Central Bank Training & Research Center, remaining at that post from 1979 to 1984. She was then appointed Deputy Manager of the Economics Department at Bank Negara Malaysia.

In 2009, Global Finance named her as one of the world's best central bank chiefs. In 2010 during the national-level Ma'al Hijrah celebrations held that year, the Malaysian government had awarded her the title of "Tokoh Ma'al Hijrah 1432H" ("Figure of the New Year 1432AH").

On 20 May 2011, Bloomberg columnist William Pesek had picked Zeti, during her post as Bank Negara governor, as one of his top four nominees to head the prestigious International Monetary Fund after the position became vacant following the resignation of Dominique Strauss-Kahn who was arrested in New York, and is presently facing sexual assault charges.

In 2013, she was again accorded “Grade A” among the heads of central banks for the 10th time by the Global Finance magazine. She was awarded alongside Philippines’ central bank governor Amando Tetangco, Jr. and Taiwan's Central Bank Governor Perng Fai-nan, from a list of central bank governors of more than 50 key countries.

Zeti was named the recipient of Central Banking's Lifetime Achievement Award in 2016.

She receives The Royal Award for Islamic Finance in honouring the excellence service in Islamic Finance on 3 October 2018.

Zeti who was the Chairman of the Asian Institute of Finance has also receives the William “Bill” Seidman Award for Lifetime Achievement in Leadership in the Financial Services Industry for 2018.

On 12 May 2018 just after the 2018 general election (GE14), the new Pakatan Harapan (PH) ruling coalition Prime Minister Mahathir Mohamad announced that Zeti was appointed as one of the members of the Council of Eminent Persons (CEP) to serves as advisors to the new PH government. She joined Daim Zainuddin, Robert Kuok, Jomo Kwame Sundaram and Hassan Marican. The purpose of the council was to advise the government on matters pertaining to economic and financial matters during the 100-days transition of power period.

Zeti was appointed the Group Chairman of Permodalan Nasional Berhad (PNB) on 1 July 2018. She was also appointed the Chairman of Sime Darby Property. She is the first woman to hold the post.

Personal life
Zeti is married to Tawfiq Ayman and they have two children.

Honours

Honours of Malaysia
 :
  Commander of the Order of Loyalty to the Crown of Malaysia (PSM) – Tan Sri (2001)
 :
 Knight Commander of the Order of the Crown of Johor (DPMJ) – Datin Paduka (1998)
  Second Class of the Royal Family Order of Johor (DK II) (2000)
 :
  Grand Knight of the Order of Sultan Ahmad Shah of Pahang (SSAP) – Dato' Sri (2002)
 :
  Grand Knight of the Order of the Territorial Crown (SUMW) – Datuk Seri Utama (2009)

Foreign honour
 :
  Gold and Silver Star of the Order of the Rising Sun (2017)

References

1947 births
Living people
People from Johor
Malaysian Muslims
Hadhrami people
House of Temenggong of Johor
Malaysian people of Circassian descent
Malaysian people of English descent
Malaysian people of Turkish descent
Malaysian people of Yemeni descent
Malaysian people of Malay descent
Malaysian civil servants
Malaysian economists
Malaysian bankers
Governors of the Central Bank of Malaysia
University of Malaya alumni
Second Classes of the Royal Family Order of Johor
Commanders of the Order of Loyalty to the Crown of Malaysia
Knights Commander of the Order of the Crown of Johor